Brixia (minor planet designation: 521 Brixia) is a minor planet orbiting the Sun that was discovered by American astronomer Raymond Smith Dugan on January 10, 1904. The name derives from Brixia, the ancient name of the Italian city of Brescia.

References

External links 
 Lightcurve plot of 521 Brixia, Palmer Divide Observatory, B. D. Warner (2009)
 Asteroid Lightcurve Database (LCDB), query form (info )
 Dictionary of Minor Planet Names, Google books
 Asteroids and comets rotation curves, CdR – Observatoire de Genève, Raoul Behrend
 Discovery Circumstances: Numbered Minor Planets (1)-(5000) – Minor Planet Center
 
 

Background asteroids
Brixia
Brixia
C-type asteroids (Tholen)
Ch-type asteroids (SMASS)
19040110